Thunder snake may refer to:

 Agkistrodon contortrix laticinctus, a.k.a. the broad-banded copperhead, a venomous pitviper subspecies found in the United States
 Agkistrodon contortrix mokasen, a.k.a. the northern copperhead, a venomous pitviper species found in the United States.
 Lampropeltis g. getula, a.k.a. the eastern kingsnake, a harmless colubrid subspecies found in the eastern United States

Animal common name disambiguation pages